The Fred W. Parris Towers are a residential apartment highrise at 1800 South Broadway Street in Little Rock, Arkansas.  Built in 1972, it is a fourteen-story skyscraper, with a steel frame clad in masonry, housing 250 residential units.  It was designed by Wittenberg, Delony & Davidson for the city as public senior housing, and exemplifies a design principle espoused by Le Corbusier known as the "tower in a park", with a large landscaped green area surrounding the building.

The apartments were listed on the National Register of Historic Places in 2017.

See also
National Register of Historic Places listings in Little Rock, Arkansas

References

Houses on the National Register of Historic Places in Arkansas
International style architecture in Arkansas
Residential buildings completed in 1974
Houses in Little Rock, Arkansas
National Register of Historic Places in Little Rock, Arkansas
1970s establishments in Arkansas